is a junction passenger railway station in located in the city of Inzai, Chiba, Japan, operated jointly by the third-sector railway operator Hokusō Railway and the private railway company Keisei Electric Railway.

Lines
It is also served by the Narita Sky Access connecting downtown Tokyo with Narita Airport, which uses the same tracks as the Hokusō Line.

Station layout
This station consists of one island platform serving two tracks, with an elevated station building located above the tracks and platforms.

Platforms

History
Chiba New Town Chūō Station was opened on 19 March 1984. On 17 July 2010 a station numbering system was introduced to the Hokusō Line, with the station designated HS12.

Passenger statistics
In fiscal 2018, the station was used by an average of 30,028 passengers daily.

Surrounding area
Inzai Post Office
Tokyo Christian University

See also
 List of railway stations in Japan

References

External links

 Hokusō Line station information 

Railway stations in Chiba Prefecture
Railway stations in Japan opened in 1984
Hokusō Line
Stations of Keisei Electric Railway
Railway stations in highway medians
Inzai